The South African Snooker Championship is the South African amateur snooker tournament that has been held since 1937 under the S.A. Billiard Control Council. From 1950 to 1993 it was held under the S.A. Billiards And Snooker Association. Jimmy van Rensberg won the title a record 12 times.

The amalgamation of the white S.A. Billiards And Snooker Association and the non-white S.A. Billiards And Snooker Control Board happened in 1994 under the new governing body - Snooker and Billiards South Africa. This finally allowed for a unified national champion - Hitesh Naran.

Winners

References

External links

South African Championship
Snooker
Snooker in South Africa
Recurring sporting events established in 1937
1937 establishments in South Africa